The 1963 Giro del Trentino was the second edition of the Tour of the Alps cycle race and was held on 22 June 1963. The race was won by Guido De Rosso.

General classification

References

1963
1963 in road cycling
1963 in Italian sport